Irwin is a city in Bonneville County, Idaho, United States. It is part of the Idaho Falls, Idaho Metropolitan Statistical Area. The population was 219 at the 2010 census.

Geography
Irwin is located at  (43.388220, -111.268118).

Demographics

2010 census
As of the census of 2010, there were 219 people, 103 households, and 70 families residing in the city. The racial makeup of the city was 99.1% White, 0.5% Asian, and 0.5% from two or more races. Hispanic or Latino of any race were 0.5% of the population.

There were 103 households, of which 15.5% had children under the age of 18 living with them, 62.1% were married couples living together, 4.9% had a female householder with no husband present, 1.0% had a male householder with no wife present, and 32.0% were non-families. 25.2% of all households were made up of individuals, and 9.7% had someone living alone who was 65 years of age or older. The average household size was 2.13 and the average family size was 2.53.

The median age in the city was 52.4 years. 11.9% of residents were under the age of 18; 5.1% were between the ages of 18 and 24; 21% were from 25 to 44; 38.4% were from 45 to 64; and 23.7% were 65 years of age or older. The gender makeup of the city was 51.6% male and 48.4% female.

2000 census
As of the census of 2000, there were 157 people, 71 households, and 47 families residing in the city. The racial makeup of the city was 98.09% White, 0.64% Asian, 1.27% from other races. Hispanic or Latino of any race were 1.91% of the population.

There were 71 households, out of which 22.5% had children under the age of 18 living with them, 60.6% were married couples living together, 2.8% had a female householder with no husband present, and 32.4% were non-families. 31.0% of all households were made up of individuals, and 15.5% had someone living alone who was 65 years of age or older. The average household size was 2.21 and the average family size was 2.73.

In the city, the population was spread out, with 19.1% under the age of 18, 5.7% from 18 to 24, 17.2% from 25 to 44, 34.4% from 45 to 64, and 23.6% who were 65 years of age or older. The median age was 48 years. For every 100 females, there were 109.3 males. For every 100 females age 18 and over, there were 98.4 males.

The median income for a household in the city was $31,250, and the median income for a family was $42,813. Males had a median income of $28,333 versus $27,250 for females. The per capita income for the city was $17,896. About 3.5% of families and 9.7% of the population were below the poverty line, including 23.4% of those under the age of eighteen and none of those 65 or over.

References

Cities in Bonneville County, Idaho
Cities in Idaho
Cities in Idaho Falls metropolitan area